Alsina is a surname. Notable people with the surname include:

Adolfo Alsina (1829–1877), Argentine lawyer and Unitarian politician
August Alsina (born 1992), American singer
Juan Perez Alsina, Argentine politician for the Salta Renewal Party
Landelino Lavilla Alsina (born 1934), Spanish politician
Dr. Manuel F. Alsina Capo (born 1909), prominent Spanish-American urologist surgeon
Oriol Alsina (born 1967), Spanish football manager
Ramón Martí Alsina (1826–1894), Spanish Eclectic painter
Valentín Alsina (1802–1869), Argentine lawyer and politician

See also
Estación Puente Alsina, Argentine railway station in the Greater Buenos Aires neighbourhood of Valentín Alsina
Puente Alsina (film), 1935 Argentine musical film directed and written by José A. Ferreyra
Puente Valentín Alsina, neo colonial bridge over the Riachuelo inaugurated in 1938
Adolfo Alsina Partido, western partido of the Buenos Aires Province, Argentina
Valentín Alsina, Buenos Aires, city in the Lanús Partido of Buenos Aires Province, Argentina
Zanja de Alsina, system of trenches and fortifications built in the centre and south of the Buenos Aires Province

Catalan-language surnames